The North & South Lanarkshire Amateur Football Association (NSLAFA) was a football (soccer) league competition for amateur clubs in the Lanarkshire region of Scotland.  It was formed in 2008 but folded in 2017.  The association is affiliated to the Scottish Amateur Football Association.  As a stand-alone Association and not part of Scotland's pyramid system, the Premier Division did not act as a feeder league and there was no promotion available.

League set-up

The North & South Lanarkshire AFA was split into two divisions, a Premier Division of 10 teams and a 12-strong Division One.

Member clubs 

The North & South Lanarkshire AFA is currently composed of 22 member clubs, listed below in their respective divisions :

Premier Division

Blantyre Soccer Academy
Carluke Hearts
Blantyre RGM
Holytown Colts
Motherwell Bridgeworks
North Motherwell
Mill United
Eddlewood
Springhill
Woodhall Thistle

Division One

Bothwell United
Chapelhall
Dal Riata
East Kilbride
The Georgian
Central Park

Cup Competitions

As well as the league, the association administers three cup competitions for teams in membership: The John Roan Cup, Paterson's Trophy and the Lanarkshire Cup.

External links
Website of the North & South Lanarkshire AFA
Website of the Scottish Amateur FA

Defunct football leagues in Scotland